Steinbauer is a German surname. Notable people with the surname include:

Anja Steinbauer (born 1966) Sinologist and philosopher
Ben Steinbauer (born 1977), American documentary film director
Jodi Appelbaum-Steinbauer (born 1956), American professional tennis player
Rudolf Steinbauer (born 1959), Austrian football player and manager
Walter Steinbauer (1945–1991), West German bobsledder

German-language surnames